The Informer is a 1929 British part-talkie drama film directed by Arthur Robison and starring Lya De Putti, Lars Hanson, Warwick Ward and Carl Harbord. The picture was based on the 1925 novel The Informer by Liam O'Flaherty. In the film, a man betrays his best friend, a member of the outlawed Irish Republican Army, to the authorities and is then pursued by the other members of the organisation. The later better-known adaptation The Informer (1935) was directed by John Ford.

Cast
 Lya De Putti as Katie Fox 
 Lars Hanson as Gypo Nolan
 Warwick Ward as Dan Gallagher
 Carl Harbord as Francis McPhilip
 Dennis Wyndham as Murphy
 Janice Adair as Bessie
 Daisy Campbell as Mrs McPhillip
 Craighall Sherry as Mulholland
 Ray Milland as Sharpshooter
 Ellen Pollock as Prostitute
 Johnny Butt as Publican

Production
The film was made at Elstree Studios by British International Pictures as the sound revolution was taking place. The film was made with a soundtrack, sound effects and talking scenes. A fully silent version was also released. Robison was one of a number of Germans engaged to work in the British Film Industry following the Film Act of 1927, which stimulated the British film industry by requiring exhibitors to show a minimum percentage of British films.

References

External links

1929 films
1929 drama films
British drama films
Films shot at British International Pictures Studios
Films directed by Arthur Robison
Irish War of Independence films
Films set in Ireland
Films about the Irish Republican Army
Films about terrorism
Films set in the 1920s
Films based on Liam O'Flaherty's works
1920s English-language films
1920s British films